Maev-Ann Wren is an Irish economist, journalist, author, and former special advisor to the Minister of State at the Department of Health, Roisin Shortall. She is the former economics editor of The Irish Times newspaper. Wren has written two books about the Irish health system and her writings have often been mentioned during Dáil and Seanad debates, and in parliamentary committee. She has been described in the Seanad as "a recognised expert on health care."

Early life
Wren grew up in Rathmines and attended University College Dublin. She graduated in 1978 with a bachelor's degree in history and economics; this was followed by a master's degree in economics from UCD and a PhD in economics from TCD. In 1978, she became the second female auditor in the history of the university's Literary and Historical Society.

Career
Wren worked at The Irish Times from 1980 to 2004 where she covered economic, political and social matters and produced an award-winning series of articles. She has reported from Dublin, Belfast and the United States, and worked as a financial reporter, business features editor, economics editor, columnist, editorial writer and senior newspaper editor. She has studied and travelled in the United States on a World Press Institute fellowship, and was a Fordham University Ethics Center Fellow for 2005.

She won the 2001 National Media Award for newspaper analysis and comment for her October 2000 series, An Unhealthy State, on the Irish health system. The following year, she reached the short list for the 2002 National Media Award for Specialist Writer of the Year for her work on a series, States of Health, comparing Irish health care with other countries'.

Her first book Unhealthy State — Anatomy of a Sick Society (2003) examined the crisis in Irish medical care, and described options for reform. Her second book, How Ireland Cares — The Case for Health Reform (2006) began life as a study of the Irish health system commissioned by the Irish Congress of Trade Unions in preparation for negotiations with the government. It was written with American health economist Professor A. Dale Tussing.

Since leaving The Irish Times in 2004, Wren has conducted independent research and graduated with a PhD in health economics from Trinity College Dublin, while continuing to contribute journalism and reports to The Sunday Business Post, Village magazine and the Economic and Social Research Institute's Quarterly Economic Commentary. She was formerly employed as a special advisor to the Labour Party Junior Minister Roisin Shortall (2011–2012). She has worked as a researcher at the Centre for Health Policy and Management at TCD (2011–2012) and as a post-doctoral research fellow at the Economic and Social Research Institute in Dublin (2013).

Wren is a Dubliner and is married to Cormac O'Rourke; they have two daughters, Claire and Sorcha.

Selected works
 Unhealthy State: Anatomy of a Sick Society. Dublin: New Island, 2003. .
 How Ireland Cares: The Case for Health Care Reform. With A. Dale Tussing. Dublin: New Island, 2006. .
 Health Spending and the Black Hole. Article in ESRI's Quarterly Economic Commentary, September 2004

See also
 Auditors of the Literary and Historical Society (University College Dublin)

References

External links

 Biographical Sketch: Maev-Ann Wren, Health Research Board.
 Maev-Ann Wren, New Island Books.
 Visiting Lecturers: Maev-Ann Wren, Fordham University.
 Only doctors can prescribe. Review of Wrens's first book, Unhealthy State. Dr Maurice Gueret, Sunday Independent.
 No remedy for our health system ills. Review of Unhealthy State by Eilish O'Regan, Irish Independent.
 Mary Harney would do well to read this. Review of Wrens's second book, How Ireland Cares. Eilish O'Regan, Irish Independent.
 Unhealthy State at New Island Books.
 How Ireland Cares at New Island Books
 Photograph of Maev-Ann Wren.

Mentions during Oireachtas debates
 Estimates, 1986. – Vote 3: Department of the Taoiseach (Revised Estimate). Deputy John Kelly, Dáil Éireann – Tuairisc Oifigiúil Volume 368, 3 July 1986.
 Health Services: Motion, Senator Joanna Tuffy, Seanad Éireann – Tuairisc Oifigiúil Volume 178 – 17 November 2004.
 Tax Reliefs and Exemptions: Presentations. Mr. Paul Sweeney, Irish Congress of Trade Unions. Joint Committee on Finance and the Public Service, Tuairisc Oifigiúil 26 October 2005.
 Other Questions. – Social Welfare Code. Deputy Willie Penrose, Dáil Éireann – Tuairisc Oifigiúil Volume 619 – 11 May 2006.
 Public Hospital Land: Motion. Senator Fergal Browne. Seanad Éireann – Tuairisc Oifigiúil Volume 183 – 31 May 2006.
 Health Bill 2006: Second Stage. Deputy Liz McManus, Dáil Éireann – Tuairisc Oifigiúil Volume 630 – 24 January 2007.
 Cancer Services: Motion (Resumed), Deputy John Gormley, Dáil Éireann – Tuairisc Oifigiúil Volume 630 – 1 February 2007.
 Private Members’ Business. – Co-location of Hospitals: Motion, Deputy Michael D. Higgins. Dáil Éireann – Tuairisc Oifigiúil Volume 637 – 27 June 2007.
 Child Care Services: Statements. Senator Ivana Bacik, Seanad Éireann – Tuairisc Oifigiúil Volume 191 – 21 October 2008.
 Health Bill 2008: Second Stage. Senator Ivana Bacik, Seanad Éireann – Tuairisc Oifigiúil Volume 192 – 12 December 2008.

Year of birth missing (living people)
Living people
Alumni of University College Dublin
Auditors of the Literary and Historical Society (University College Dublin)
20th-century Irish journalists
Irish women journalists
Alumni of Trinity College Dublin
Writers from Dublin (city)
Business Post people
The Irish Times people
20th-century Irish economists
People from Dublin (city) in health professions
21st-century Irish economists
Health economists